James Jewett Carnes (November 16, 1899 – July 19, 1986) was an American military leader. He served as Governor of the Free Territory of Trieste in 1947.

Life
Carnes was born in Royalton, Minnesota. He graduated from the United States Military Academy at West Point in 1923 and joined the United States Army. He died in Fort Lauderdale, Florida and was buried at Riverside Cemetery in Royalton.

References

External links
 

1899 births
1986 deaths
People from Royalton, Minnesota
Military personnel from Minnesota
United States Military Academy alumni